Dirk Jan Klaas "Klaas-Jan" Huntelaar (born 12 August 1983) is a Dutch former professional footballer who played as a striker.

Huntelaar played for PSV, De Graafschap, AGOVV Apeldoorn, Heerenveen, Ajax, Real Madrid and Milan, before joining Schalke 04 in August 2010, for whom he was the top goalscorer in the 2011–12 Bundesliga with 29 league goals. Huntelaar is also Schalke's second highest goalscorer of all time, behind Klaus Fischer.

Huntelaar was named Dutch Football Talent of the Year and Ajax "Player of the Year" in 2006, and was a part of the Dutch side that won the 2006 UEFA U-21 Championship where he became the tournament's leading goalscorer and received the player of the tournament award. He was also named as one of two strikers in the UEFA Team of the Tournament. He is the all-time top scorer of the Netherlands U-21 national team with 18 goals in 23 appearances.

Early life
Huntelaar was born in Voor-Drempt, a village in the Achterhoek region of Netherlands, but moved to Hummelo when he was six weeks old. He lived with parents Dirk-Jan and Maud Huntelaar, and his two brothers Niek and Jelle. At the age of five, Huntelaar, along with his two brothers, joined the local football team VV H. en K., where he played for the next six years. He was scouted as a youth talent during this period by Go Ahead Eagles but the distance required to travel to the team's base in Deventer prevented him from joining the club.

Soon after, he was scouted by De Graafschap and on 6 April 1994 he signed his first youth contract, aged 10. During his first two years with De Graafschap, Huntelaar played in various positions including left wing, attacking midfield, left back, and even goalkeeper; only in his third year was he deployed as a striker.

In the 1997–98 season, the 14-year-old Huntelaar was the main striker for the C-team at De Graafschap and scored 33 goals in 20 matches. The following season saw him promoted to the B1 team, and in the 1999–2000 season he became top scorer of the B1 league with 31 goals. His goalscoring abilities drew the attention of PSV Eindhoven, who subsequently signed him in June 2000.

Club career

PSV
In his first season at PSV, Huntelaar quickly established himself as a prolific goalscorer for their A1 youth teams under coach Willy van der Kuijlen, scoring 26 goals in 23 games to become top scorer in the youth league. In his second season at PSV, Huntelaar was added to the senior squad under coach Guus Hiddink. He made his first team debut on 23 November 2002 in a 0–3 away win over Roosendaal, coming on as a second-half substitute for Mateja Kežman in the 76th minute. However, this turned out to be his only appearance for PSV.

De Graafschap
By the start of 2003, it was clear that Huntelaar's path into the first team was blocked, therefore he was sent out on loan to his previous club De Graafschap, where his uncle was financial director. He made his senior debut for De Graafschap on 8 February 2003, coming on as a substitute for Hans van de Haar against Roosendaal. He made his only appearance in the starting lineup on 16 February 2003 as De Graafschap were beaten 1–5 by his future club Heerenveen. He then made his final appearance in the team on 29 May 2003 as De Graafschap lost 2–1 to FC Zwolle, confirming their demotion from the Eredivisie. In total, Huntelaar made nine Eredivisie appearances for the Super Farmers, one as a starter and eight as a substitute, but was unable to score and De Graafschap decided not to extend his loan.

AGOVV
At the start of the 2003–04 season, Huntelaar was again sent out on loan, this time to newly promoted Eerste Divisie side AGOVV Apeldoorn under coach Jurrie Koolhof. He made a solid start, scoring on his debut for AGOVV against TOP Oss, and then scoring a hat-trick in his second league game against Heracles Almelo. Huntelaar scored 26 goals in 35 league appearances and finished the season as the division's top goalscorer as well as being named the Eerste Divisie's Player of the Season. AGOVV later went on to name one of the stands at their Sportpark Berg & Bos stadium the "Klaas-Jan Huntelaar stand" in tribute to his impact at the club.

Heerenveen

At the end of his loan at AGOVV, Huntelaar turned down the opportunity to sign a new contract with PSV, and Frisian club Heerenveen moved in to sign him. Huntelaar started the 2004–05 season by scoring on his Eredivisie debut with Heerenveen against AZ Alkmaar and took his scoring tally to ten goals in 17 games at the winter break. At the end of the season, Huntelaar had scored a total of 17 goals in 31 matches, helping Heerenveen qualify for the 2005–06 UEFA Cup. In the 2005–06 season, Huntelaar continued where he had left off in his first season at Heerenveen, and by the winter, he had scored 17 goals in 15 matches at which point the top Dutch clubs began vying for his signature.

Ajax

2005–06 season
In January 2006, Huntelaar signed for Ajax, the club he had supported as a child. Heerenveen received €9 million plus future incentives for the player, with 15% (€1.35 million) of the fee going to PSV. Huntelaar made his Ajax debut after the winter break and scored his first goal for the team on 5 February 2006 against former club Heerenveen in a KNVB Cup tie. In February, Huntelaar scored nine goals in seven matches for Ajax, including against Serie A club Inter Milan on his UEFA Champions League debut. Huntelaar ended the season as top scorer for Ajax with 16 league goals in 16 appearances despite only joining in January, and also finished up as the Eredivise's top scorer with 33 league goals. He scored a total of 44 goals in 47 appearances in all club competitions. Ajax finished fourth in the Eredivisie and Huntelaar featured in the Eredivisie Playoffs for Champions League qualification, scoring in consecutive matches against Feyenoord as well as playing in the victory over Groningen to secure Ajax's place in the following season's Champions League. In the KNVB Cup semi-final, Huntelaar scored a bicycle kick equalizer in injury-time against Roda JC, taking the game to extra-time. Ajax went on to win 4–1 with Huntelaar scoring another goal in the 109th minute. In the final, against his former club PSV, Huntelaar scored two goals to help Ajax win the KNVB Cup 2–1. Huntelaar was named Dutch Football Talent of the Year and Ajax Player of the Year for 2005–06.

2006–07 season

In July 2006, Huntelaar became the first player to score at Arsenal's new Emirates Stadium in a testimonial match for Dennis Bergkamp. He was named vice-captain of Ajax for 2006–07 in his first full season at the club. Huntelaar scored two goals for Ajax in a Champions League qualifying match against Copenhagen to secure a 1–2 away win in the first leg, but a 0–2 home defeat in the second leg saw them knocked out of the Champions League on aggregate. Ajax went on to play in the UEFA Cup, where Huntelaar scored seven goals in seven matches, including against Werder Bremen, who would eliminate them in the third round. In the Eredivisie, Huntelaar scored 21 goals as Ajax again finished second, once more having to play in the Eredivisie Playoffs to claim a place in the Champions League. Huntelaar scored two goals in the second leg of the Playoffs semi-final against Heerenveen in a 4–1 aggregate win. Ajax then beat AZ Alkmaar 4–2 on aggregate for a place in the third qualifying round of the Champions League. In the KNVB Cup, Huntelaar scored four goals in six matches, including an equalizer in the final against Alkmaar which ended in a 1–1 draw after extra-time. Huntelaar scored in the penalty shoot-out decider to help Ajax retain the KNVB Cup, winning 8–7 on penalties. Huntelaar scored 36 goals in 51 games in all competitions for Ajax in 2006–07.

2007–09
In 2007–08, Huntelaar partnered up front with new striking-partner Luis Suárez. However, Ajax were again knocked out of the Champions League at the qualifying stage, with Huntelaar missing a penalty in the first leg against Slavia Prague. Ajax were also eliminated from the UEFA Cup by Dinamo Zagreb on away goals, with Huntelaar's two goals not enough to secure Ajax's place in the competition. In the first Eredivisie match of the season, Huntelaar scored four goals in a 1–8 away victory over newly promoted De Graafschap. Following the retirement of Jaap Stam in October 2007, Huntelaar was made temporary captain, pending the return of experienced midfielder Edgar Davids from injury. On 6 April 2008, Huntelaar scored his 100th goal in the Eredivise with a hat-trick in Ajax's 4–1 win against De Graafschap. In the previous 25 years, only Dennis Bergkamp and Dirk Kuyt had managed that feat before their 25th birthday. Huntelaar finished the season with 33 goals in 34 appearances, becoming top scorer in the Eredivisie and the first Ajax player to score 30 league goals in a season for 21 years, since Marco van Basten in 1986–87.

At the start of the 2008–09 season, Marco van Basten was appointed as Ajax coach and named Huntelaar permanent first team captain. Huntelaar scored nine goals in 15 appearances in all competitions before suffering torn ankle ligaments on 9 November 2008 in a league match against Sparta Rotterdam. He would not play again for fully eight weeks later and it turned out to be his last game for Ajax.

Real Madrid

At the start of December 2008, Real Madrid reached an agreement with Ajax to sign Huntelaar in the mid-season transfer window in January. Huntelaar joined Real Madrid in January 2009 for an initial fee thought to be worth €20 million, potentially rising to €27 million. Huntelaar made his debut on 4 January on his return from injury in a La Liga home match against Villarreal. He played for 56 minutes and made four further appearances as a substitute, before scoring his first goal for the team on 15 February in a 0–4 away win at Sporting Gijón. Madrid had planned to add both Huntelaar and fellow new signing Lassana Diarra to their 2008–09 Champions League squad, but both players had already featured in the same season's UEFA Cup for previous clubs Ajax and Portsmouth, respectively. UEFA rules would allow only one of the pair to be registered by 1 February and Diarra was selected to play in the competition. Huntelaar went on to score eight goals in 20 appearances (13 starts and seven substitute appearances) in just half a season at Madrid.

A.C. Milan
On 6 August 2009, Huntelaar transferred to Serie A club A.C. Milan for €17.75 million, signing a four-year contract. On 29 August, Huntelaar made his competitive league debut for Milan coming on as a sub in the 0–4 loss to cross-city rivals Inter Milan in the Derby della Madonnina. After a slow start, Huntelaar scored his first Milan goals on 29 November in a 0–2 away win at Catania, scoring twice after coming on in the 84th minute.

After the match, manager Leonardo stated that he would give Huntelaar more chances. However, he only appeared as a substitute for the next few matches, and because of the great form of teammate Marco Borriello, Huntelaar did not even appear as a substitute very often until Borriello's injury. Huntelaar capitalized on the opportunity by scoring his second brace of the season, helping Milan to a 3–2 defeat of Udinese. When Borriello hit bad form, Huntelaar was expected to play more often, but Leonardo chose to play veteran Filippo Inzaghi instead. On 3 April, Huntelaar started the match against Cagliari and scored from 30 meters out to stretch his goal tally to seven.

Schalke 04

On 31 August 2010, Bundesliga club Schalke 04 signed Huntelaar for a fee of €12 million. On 19 September, he scored his first goal for Schalke in a 1–3 home defeat against regional rivals Borussia Dortmund, and he added two in a Champions League group stage match against Lyon on 24 November 2010. On 21 May 2011, Huntelaar scored a brace against MSV Duisburg in the 2011 DFB-Pokal Final, securing a 5–0 win for Schalke, the club's fifth DFB-Pokal championship and their first major trophy in nine years. Huntelaar finished the 2010–11 season by scoring 13 goals in 35 matches.

On 31 July 2011, Huntelaar scored four times in an 11–1 cup thrashing away to Teningen of the Landesliga Südbaden. and he scored a hat-trick to win Schalke's first points of the season in a 5–1 win over 1. FC Köln at the Veltins-Arena. On 25 August, Huntelaar scored four goals, including two penalties, in a 6–1 win in the qualifying play-off round of the UEFA Europa League against HJK Helsinki, allowing Schalke to overturn a 2–0 first leg deficit and advance to the group stage 6–3 on aggregate. After the resignation of head coach Ralf Rangnick on 22 September 2011, former Royal Blues manager Huub Stevens returned to the team for their game against Hamburger SV on 2 October. Huntelaar powered his side to victory in Stevens' first game back, heading in a sensational opening goal and netting the winner in the 73rd minute with a flick past goalkeeper Jaroslav Drobný. He scored a hat-trick in a 4–1 win over Twente in the Europa League, and finished the season with 38 goals in 37 appearances. He said in February 2012 that he would reach his playing peak in two years time, because of his later physical development. Huntelaar scored a second-half brace in the club's 3–2 victory over Werder Bremen on the last day of the season, earning his side automatic qualification into the group stage of the Champions League. The two goals also meant that Huntelaar finished the season with 29 goals from 34 league games, making him the first Dutch player to earn top scorer in the Bundesliga.

On 23 December 2012, Schalke announced that Huntelaar signed a two-year contract extension to 30 June 2015. Huntelaar finished the 2012–13 season with 16 goals in 35 matches. The following season, Huntelaar scored 14 goals in 21 matches.

On 31 January 2015, Huntelaar received a straight red card for a slide tackle on Manuel Schmiedebach of Hannover 96. The German Football Association (DFB) gave him a six-match ban, which Schalke appealed. On 10 March 2015, Huntelaar scored twice against former club Real Madrid in a 3–4 victory at the Santiago Bernabéu. He had not scored a league goal since November 2014, after going over 1,000 minutes and 13 games without scoring. This has led to some minor criticism over his performance in the current season from his fans and the team's coach. This goalless run, however, ended on 2 May 2015, when he scored an equaliser against VfB Stuttgart. Huntelaar finished the season with 14 goals in 37 matches.

On 8 August 2015, Huntelaar marked his 2015–16 season debut by scoring in a 0–5 win at MSV Duisburg in the first round of the German Cup. Huntelaar finished the 2015–16 season with 16 goals in 40 matches.

Due to injuries and a drop in form, during the 2016–17 Bundesliga season Huntelaar only made 16 appearances in the league (7 starts, 9 appearances from the bench), and overall 24 appearances in all competitions (10 starts, 14 appearances from the bench), scoring a total of only five goals, his lowest season goal tally at Schalke 04.

Return to Ajax

On 1 June 2017, Ajax confirmed that they had re-signed Huntelaar. In 2019, he won with Ajax the Eredivisie, KNVB Cup and Johan Cruyff Shield; in addition, he played in the 2018–19 UEFA Champions League, in which his team reached the semi-finals.

On 12 December 2020, Huntelaar announced that he would retire at the end of the 2020–21 season.

On 14 January 2021, Huntelaar scored twice within three minutes of coming on as a substitute to give Ajax a 3–1 win over FC Twente.

Return to Schalke 04
On 19 January 2021, Schalke 04 confirmed that they had signed Huntelaar until the end of the season. With his goal in the 1–2 defeat against Bayer Leverkusen on 3 April 2021, he became Schalke's oldest Bundesliga goalscorer at the age of 37 years and 234 days.

International career

Youth
Huntelaar played in the 2001 FIFA World Youth Championship for the Netherlands under coach Louis van Gaal. He scored two goals in the tournament before the Dutch were eliminated in the quarter-finals by Egypt. After scoring 44 goals in 47 appearances for Heerenveen and Ajax in all competitions during 2005–06, Huntelaar was named in the preliminary Netherlands squad for the 2006 FIFA World Cup, but was not selected for the final squad and instead sent to play in the UEFA Under-21 Championship held in Portugal. Huntelaar became top scorer in the tournament with four goals including two in the final on 4 June 2006 to help the Netherlands beat Ukraine 3–0 and claim their first ever title at under-21 level. Huntelaar was named as one of two strikers in the UEFA Team of the Tournament. In the aftermath, Huntelaar was promoted from the under-21 squad where he remains the Netherlands all-time top goalscorer with 18 goals in 22 matches.

Senior

Following his achievements with the under-21 squad, Huntelaar was selected by senior team coach Marco van Basten for the Dutch national team's next friendly match, away against the Republic of Ireland on 16 August 2006. He scored two goals and provided two assists on his senior debut in the Netherlands' 0–4 away win at Lansdowne Road, making him the first Dutch player to score on his full international debut for 28 years since Dick Nanninga in 1978.

After being left out for a number of games, he was recalled to the squad in October 2007 for the UEFA Euro 2008 Qualifying games against Romania and Slovenia. Due to the suspension of striker Ruud van Nistelrooy, Huntelaar was in the starting line-up against Slovenia and went on to score his first competitive international goal in the Netherlands 2–0 victory. Huntelaar was included in the Netherlands Euro 2008 squad, and scored in his only appearance in the tournament with the opening goal of their final Group C match against Romania in a 2–0 victory.

With the retirement of Ruud van Nistelrooy, Huntelaar became new Dutch national team coach Bert van Marwijk's first choice striker for the 2010 World Cup qualification match against Iceland in October 2008, and scored in a 2–0 victory. Huntelaar was included in the preliminary squad for the 2010 World Cup in South Africa. On 27 May 2010, Van Marwijk announced that the player would be part of the final squad of 23 participating in the competition. On 24 June, he replaced goalscorer Robin van Persie in the 58th minute against Cameroon at the Green Point Stadium in Cape Town and scored the winning goal in the 83rd minute in a 2–1 win, taking his goal tally to 16 in 34 games for the Netherlands. Huntelaar also came on as a substitute for Van Persie in the round of 16 game against Slovakia and in the quarter-final against Brazil. He was an unused substitute in the final against Spain as the Netherlands lost their third World Cup final 0–1 due to a late goal by Andrés Iniesta.

On 3 September 2010, Huntelaar scored a hat-trick against San Marino in a Euro 2012 qualifying match away at the Stadio Olimpico, a match which the Netherlands won 0–5. He followed this up with both goals for the Netherlands as they defeated Finland on 7 September 2010 in Rotterdam.

Huntelaar added further goals to his tally, with a double in a 4–1 win against Sweden on 12 October 2010. He was the top goalscorer in the UEFA Euro 2012 qualifying competition with 12 goals, leaving him one shy of Northern Ireland's David Healy's all-time qualification record.

At the 2014 World Cup, Huntelaar came off the bench for Robin van Persie in the round of 16 match against Mexico with the Netherlands 0–1 down. He went on to provide the assist for Wesley Sneijder, and scored the winning goal with an injury-time penalty to qualify the team for the quarter-finals. Huntelaar admitted after the match that team captain Arjen Robben was supposed to take the penalty but offered him instead to take the penalty since Huntelaar was playing well after leaving the bench.

Style of play
Huntelaar was described as a "prolific striker" with a "brilliant first touch" and was compared in style to players such as Marco van Basten and Ruud van Nistelrooy. In 2009, former Netherlands national team manager Louis van Gaal was quoted saying about the player, "in the penalty area, he is the best player in the world, bar none."

Post-playing career

Ajax
Following the departure of Ajax' director of football affairs Marc Overmars, Huntelaar joined his former club's technical staff, where he will be assisting technical manager Gerry Hamstra and head coach Alfred Schreuder.

Personal life
Since 2000, Huntelaar has been in a relationship with his girlfriend Maddy Schoolderman. The couple have four children together: sons Seb (born 9 April 2009), Axel (born 20 July 2011), and Jim (born 2 January 2017), and daughter Puck (born 6 August 2013). His nephew Koen Huntelaar is now a professional footballer.

Career statistics

Club

International

Source:

Scores and results list the Netherlands' goal tally first, score column indicates score after each Huntelaar goal.

Honours
Ajax
 Eredivisie: 2018–19, 2020–21
 KNVB Cup: 2005–06, 2006–07, 2018–19
 Johan Cruyff Shield: 2006, 2007, 2019

Schalke 04
 DFB-Pokal: 2010–11
 DFL-Supercup: 2011

Netherlands Youth

 UEFA European Under-21 Championship: 2006

Netherlands
 FIFA World Cup runner-up 2010; third place 2014

Individual

 Eerste Divisie top scorer: 2003–04
 Eerste Divisie Player of the Year: 2003–04
 Eredivisie top scorer: 2005–06, 2007–08
 Johan Cruyff Trophy: 2005–06
 Ajax Player of the Year (Rinus Michels Award): 2005–06
 UEFA European Under-21 Championship Golden Boot: 2006
 UEFA European Under-21 Championship Golden Player: 2006
 Bundesliga top goalscorer: 2011–12
 kicker Bundesliga Team of the Season: 2011–12
 UEFA Euro 2012 qualifying top goalscorer

References

External links

  
 
 

1983 births
Living people
People from Bronckhorst
Dutch footballers
Association football forwards
PSV Eindhoven players
De Graafschap players
AGOVV Apeldoorn players
SC Heerenveen players
AFC Ajax players
Real Madrid CF players
A.C. Milan players
FC Schalke 04 players
Eredivisie players
Eerste Divisie players
La Liga players
Serie A players
Bundesliga players
Kicker-Torjägerkanone Award winners
Netherlands youth international footballers
Netherlands under-21 international footballers
Netherlands international footballers
UEFA Euro 2008 players
2010 FIFA World Cup players
UEFA Euro 2012 players
2014 FIFA World Cup players
Dutch expatriate footballers
Dutch expatriate sportspeople in Spain
Dutch expatriate sportspeople in Italy
Dutch expatriate sportspeople in Germany
Expatriate footballers in Spain
Expatriate footballers in Italy
Expatriate footballers in Germany
Footballers from Gelderland
AFC Ajax non-playing staff